John William Valentin (born February 18, 1967) is a former shortstop and third baseman in Major League Baseball (MLB). He played for the Boston Red Sox from 1992 to 2001, and spent a final season with the New York Mets in 2002. He later became a coach for the Los Angeles Dodgers.

Amateur career
Raised in Jersey City, New Jersey, Valentin attended St. Anthony High School, where he played baseball and basketball. He was teammates on the basketball team with David Rivers.

Valentin attended Seton Hall University, where he played college baseball for the Pirates under head coach Mike Sheppard.  Valentin's teammates included future major leaguers Mo Vaughn and Craig Biggio. In 1988, he played collegiate summer baseball in the Cape Cod Baseball League for the Hyannis Mets. He was drafted by the Boston Red Sox in the 5th round of the 1988 MLB Draft.

Professional career
Valentin made his MLB debut as the starting shortstop against the Texas Rangers on July 27, 1992. He had one hit in four at-bats in his debut, with his first hit coming on an RBI single to short in the bottom of the 8th inning off of the Rangers Terry Mathews. He hit his first home run on August 22, 1992, off of Mike Schooler of the Seattle Mariners.

On July 8, 1994, Valentin turned the 10th unassisted triple play in MLB history, in a game against the Mariners. Playing shortstop in the 6th inning, Valentin caught Marc Newfield's line drive, tagged second base before Mike Blowers could return to tag up, and tagged out Keith Mitchell who had been attempting to advance to second base.

His best season was 1995, when he batted .298 with 27 home runs, 37 doubles, 20 stolen bases and 81 walks. Valentin finished ninth in the American League MVP voting, and helped lead the Red Sox to its first division title since 1990. Valentin had a .971 fielding percentage in his first three years as a shortstop for the Red Sox.

On June 6, 1996, he hit for the cycle. During the 1996 season, Red Sox prospect Nomar Garciaparra battled for the spot of shortstop with Valentin, who had held the position for his entire career. Garciaparra took over the shortstop position in 1997, forcing Valentin to second base. Later that season, he shifted to third base after the regular third baseman, Tim Naehring, was injured. Valentin spent four more seasons with the Red Sox (playing only a total of 30 games over his last two years in a Red Sox uniform, the 2000 and 2001 seasons)

He signed with the New York Mets as a free agent after the 2001 season and played in 114 games for them in 2002.

In 11 seasons with the Red Sox and Mets, Valentin had a .279 batting average, and accumulated a total of 1093 hits. He hit 124 career home runs, and had 558 runs batted in.

Valentin is the only Major League player to have pulled off an unassisted triple play, hit for the cycle and hit three home runs in a game.

Post-playing days
In January 2008, Valentin joined the Inland Empire 66ers of San Bernardino (the High-A minor league affiliate of the Los Angeles Dodgers) as hitting coach for the 2008 season. Shortly after accepting this assignment, manager Dave Collins resigned for personal reasons, and Valentin was promoted to manager of the 66ers . On Friday, October 31, 2008, he was named manager of the Chattanooga Lookouts of the Southern League (AA). After one season at the helm of the Lookouts he was demoted to hitting coach for the 2010 season. In 2011, he was promoted to the coaching staff of the AAA Albuquerque Isotopes. On November 13, 2012, he joined the Dodgers Major League staff as the Assistant Hitting Coach. In 2016, the Dodgers reassigned him as the hitting coach for the Class-A Great Lakes Loons of the Midwest League.

Valentin has been a resident of Holmdel Township, New Jersey. He owned the now-closed Julia's Restaurant in Atlantic Highlands, New Jersey.

See also
 List of Major League Baseball annual doubles leaders
 List of Major League Baseball players to hit for the cycle

Notes

Sources
 Grossman, Leigh (compiler). The Red Sox Fan Handbook. Pomfret, Connecticut: Swordsmith Books. . Pgs. 180–181.
 Stout, Glenn and Johnson, Richard A. Red Sox Century. New York: Houghton Mifflin Company. . Pg. 432.

References

External links

1967 births
Living people
Major League Baseball shortstops
Major League Baseball third basemen
Baseball players from New Jersey
Boston Red Sox players
New York Mets players
Elmira Pioneers players
Lynchburg Red Sox players
Winter Haven Red Sox players
New Britain Red Sox players
Pawtucket Red Sox players
Hyannis Harbor Hawks players
Chattanooga Lookouts managers
People from Holmdel Township, New Jersey
People from Mineola, New York
Sportspeople from Queens, New York
Baseball players from New York City
Sportspeople from Jersey City, New Jersey
Seton Hall Pirates baseball players
Los Angeles Dodgers coaches
Silver Slugger Award winners
Minor league baseball coaches
St. Anthony High School (New Jersey) alumni